The Providence Public School Department is the administrative force behind the primary public school district of Providence, Rhode Island. As of December 2017, it serves over 23,000 students in 43 schools, 3 annexes, 2 charter schools, and 2 centers servicing students with disabilities.

Providence Public Schools rank third when compared to public schools in New England. Worcester Public and Boston Public are ranked 1st and 2nd.

Vision and mission 

Vision

The Providence Public School District will be a national leader in educating urban youth.

Mission

The Providence Public School District will prepare all students to succeed in the nation’s colleges and universities, and in their chosen professions.

History 
Providence civic leader John Howland established a system of free public education by means of the School Act in 1828. During the 1830s and 1840s, that system grew and prospered, especially in Providence, owing to the exertions of Samuel Bridgham, Nathan Bishop, and Thomas Wilson Dorr. Education specialist Henry Barnard was recruited as the first state commissioner of education until 1849, with the aim of bringing the other towns to the high educational level which had been achieved by Providence. Barnard observed that "the city of Providence has already gained to itself an extended reputation and made itself a bright example to many other cities."

List of schools

Elementary schools
As of the 2022-2023 school year

 Bailey
 Carnevale 
 D’Abate
 Feinstein at Broad Street
 Feinstein at Sackett Street
 Fogarty 
 Fortes 
 Frank Spaziano & Annex
 Gregorian
 Kennedy
 King
 Kizirian
 Lauro
 Lima
 Lima Annex
 Messer
 Pleasant View
 Reservoir
 Veazie
 Webster
 West
 Young & Woods

Middle schools
As of the 2022–2023 school year

 Delsesto 
 Esek Hopkins
 Gibert Stuart
 Nathan Bishop 
 Nathanael Greene
 Roger Willams 
 West Broadway

High schools
As of the 2022-2023 school year

 Classical
 Central
 Hope
 Mount Pleasant
 Juanita Sanchez Complex
 Dr. Jorge Alvarez High School
 Providence Career Tech Academy

Charter schools
 Textron Chamber of Commerce Providence Public Charter School
 The Times2 Academy
 Highlander Charter School
 Paul Cuffee Charter School
 Achievement First

Centers servicing students with significant disabilities

 Harold A. Birch Vocational Program
 Hope High School Special Education

Former schools
 Brigham
 St. Charles Vocational Program
 Windmill Street School

Transition Programs
Special Education Students are 18-25 ages students some are disabilities on IEP/504 Plan

 Providence Autism School to Tomorrow Academy (PASTTA)

 Providence Transition Academy

Student achievement

Not Making Adequate Yearly Progress 

According to the 2010–2011 AYP Summary Reports 50% of schools in the district are making Adequate Yearly Progress.
The district received the AYP Status of Not Making Adequate Yearly Progress for Elementary, Middle, and High Schools.

NECAP results

District NECAP results for 2015–16 were significantly below state averages.

Graduation rates

Four-year graduation rate (students entering grade 9 in 2009–2010)
(as reported by the Rhode Island Department of Education)

Five-year graduation rate (students entering grade 9 in 2008–2009)
(as reported by the Rhode Island Department of Education)

Historic graduation rate data
(as reported by the district)

Population

2010–2011 school year 

District data from 2010–2011 school year

Demographics

 14,715 or 63% Hispanic
 4,521 or 19% Black
 2,175 or 9% White
 1,237 or 5% Asian
 676 or 3% Multi-racial
 215 or 1% Native American

Free and reduced lunches 
 Elementary: 82% free, 6% reduced, 4% paid
 Middle: 83% free, 6% reduced, 5% paid
 High: 74% free, 8% reduced, 7% paid
 Transition: 74% free, 8% reduced, 10% paid

Universal Free Lunch Program in all middle and high schools.

Special populations
Special Education

As of June 2022, 4,615 students in the district, ages 3–25, were identified as having disabilities.

Language programs

994 (19%) - Exited students being monitored

5,344 - Total with monitoring & ENE

Staff: 3,242

Teacher and administrator demographics from 2005–06

Teaching staff demographics

 82% White
 7.6% Black
 8.8% Hispanic
 1.2% Asian / Pacific Islander
 0.4% American Indian
 27% Male | 73% Female

Administrator demographics

 62% White
 24% Black
 12% Hispanic
 2% Asian / Pacific Islander
 0% American Indian
 48% Male | 52% Female

Population changes over time

Student population data

Changes in demographics

Finances

Bus Budget 
FY 22-23 Bus Budget: $335.5M

Budget 
FY 19-20 Budget: $395,628,201

Per-pupil spending 
FY 17-18 spending per pupil: $15,305

References

External links

Providence Public School District
Johnson, Bailey. (2011, February 23). "Providence, RI School District: All Teachers Are Fired," CBS News
Sardelli, Melissa, and Tim O'Coin. (2011, March 29). "Prov. Supt. Tom Brady stepping down: Will resign July 15," FoxProvidence.com.
Guide to the Providence School Department records from the Rhode Island State Archives

School districts in Rhode Island
Education in Providence, Rhode Island
Government of Providence, Rhode Island
School districts established in 1977
1977 establishments in Rhode Island